Chediston is a village and a civil parish on the B1123 road, in the East Suffolk district, in the English county of Suffolk. It is located 2 miles west of Halesworth, its post town. The population of the civil parish as of the 2011 census was 195 and in 2018 it was estimated to be 234.

Parish church
Chediston has a parish church, dedicated to St Mary. The bulk of the current building dates from the 13th century and the 15th century, although there are traces of Norman stonework, and some Victorian restoration features, including much of the glass.

History
Chediston, mentioned in the Doomsday book 1086 also known as Cedestan, Cheddeston, Sedestane and other variations is thought to take its name from Saint Cedd (Cedd's town). Another possibility is that Cedd preached from a large glacial erattic stone (Cedd's stone) which can still be seen at Rockstone in Chediston. The parish was once administered by the Augustinian Order, based in Pentney, Norfolk, along with four other parishes.

Chediston Green
There is a dispersed settlement at Chediston Green lying about half a mile away from the church to the north. The pub at Chediston Green, named The Duke of Wellington, is now closed and has been converted into a private dwelling.

Civil parish
Chediston shares a parish council with the nearby villages of Linstead Magna and Linstead Parva.

Notable residents
Walter Plumer, Member of Parliament for Aldeburgh

Location grid

References 

 https://web.archive.org/web/20101022033245/http://www.onesuffolk.co.uk/chedistonandlinsteadpc
 http://www.genuki.org.uk/big/eng/SFK/Chediston/index.html

Villages in Suffolk
Civil parishes in Suffolk